Siphula is a genus of lichenized fungi in the Icmadophilaceae family. The widespread genus contains about 33 species. Siphula was circumscribed by Swedish mycologist Elias Fries in 1831.

Species

Siphula abbatiana 
Siphula abscondita 
Siphula applanata 
Siphula aquatica 
Siphula australiensis 
Siphula ceratites 
Siphula coriacea 
Siphula decumbens 
Siphula dissoluta 
Siphula fastigiata 
Siphula flavovirens 
Siphula gracilis 
Siphula parhamii 
Siphula pteruloides 
Siphula verrucigera 
Siphulastrum cladinoides 
Siphulastrum granulatum 
Siphulastrum mamillatum 
Siphulastrum triste 
Siphulastrum usneoides

References

Pertusariales
Pertusariales genera
Taxa named by Elias Magnus Fries
Taxa described in 1831